Civil Station is a residential area situated in the City of Thrissur in Kerala state of India. Civil Station is Ward 54 of Thrissur Municipal Corporation.

See also
Thrissur District

References

Suburbs of Thrissur city